The 43rd World Cup season began in late October 2008 in Sölden, Austria, and concluded in mid-March 2009, at the World Cup finals in Åre, Sweden.

Aksel Lund Svindal of Norway won the overall title by two points over Benjamin Raich of Austria. Svindal returned from a season-ending injury in December 2007, and also took the season title in super-G. Lindsey Vonn of the U.S. repeated as women's overall champion, taking the title by a substantial 384 points over Maria Riesch of Germany. Vonn also repeated as the season downhill champion, and added the season title in super-G.

Being an odd-numbered year, a break in the World Cup schedule was for the biennial World Championships. The 2009 World Championships were held 2–15 February in Val-d'Isère, Savoie, France.

No pre-Olympic World Cup alpine events were run at Whistler Mountain, Canada, during the 2009 season. In late February 2008, a women's downhill and super-combined were run on Franz's Run, the women's Olympic course. The most recent men's World Cup events on the Dave Murray Downhill course were held in late February 1995. The World Cup races in North America were switched to the early part of the season in the fall of 1995, and the men's speed events at Whistler were canceled three consecutive years (December 1996–98) due to weather issues, which prompted the switch to Lake Louise in Alberta in December 1999.

Calendar

Men

Ladies

Nations team event

Men's standings

Overall

Downhill

Super-G

Giant slalom

Slalom

Super combined

Ladies' standings

Overall

Downhill

Super-G

Giant slalom

Slalom

Super combined

Nations Cup

Overall

Men

Ladies

Footnotes

References

External links
 FIS-ski.com – World Cup standings
 Ski Racing.com – U.S.-based magazine – alpine racing news
 U.S. Ski Team.com – alpine news

FIS Alpine Ski World Cup
World Cup
World Cup